Founded in 1999, the Canadian Comedy Awards have a mandate "to recognize, celebrate and promote Canadian achievements in comedy at home and abroad." The awards ceremonies are known for placing "gags over glamour" with quick wit and improvisational skills shown by hosts, presenters and recipients. From 2002 to 2015, the awards ceremony was held as part of the Canadian Comedy Awards Festival, with dozens of comedy events.

Footnotes

Notes

References

Lists of award ceremonies